USS Wilrose II (SP-195) -- also referred to in United States Navy records as USS Wild Rose, USS Wildrose, and USS Wilrose -- was a U.S. Navy patrol vessel in service from 1918 to 1919.

Wilrose II was built as a civilian motorboat of the same name in 1908 by S. P. Noch at Stamford, Connecticut. The U.S. Navy acquired her from her owner, R. H. Meyer of Jacksonville, Florida, on 3 May 1918 at Jacksonville for World War I service as a patrol vessel. She was placed in service as USS Wilrose II (SP-195) on 8 May 1918.

Wilrose II served with the section patrol contingent of the 6th Naval District, which then included the coasts of South Carolina, Georgia, and Florida as far south as the St. Johns River. She was responsible for patrolling along that coastline and its harbors to protect them against enemy attack, primarily against the German submarine menace. She pursued that duty through 11 November 1918, when the armistice with Germany ending World War I made such patrols unnecessary. After the war, she remained in active service in the 6th Naval District at least until the waning months of 1919.

In January 1920, Wilrose II was slated for sale, and she was sold on 10 March 1920 to the Charles Dry Dock and Machine Company of Charleston, South Carolina. Presumably, her name was stricken from the Navy Directory concurrently with the sale.

References

NavSource Online: Section Patrol Craft Photo Archive: Wilrose II (SP 195)

Patrol vessels of the United States Navy
World War I patrol vessels of the United States
Ships built in Stamford, Connecticut
1908 ships